Irving Andrews Fish (August 25, 1881 – April 22, 1948) was a lawyer and member of the Wisconsin National Guard and Major general in the United States Army during World War II. A veteran of World War I, Fish rose to the command of 32nd Infantry Division ("Red Arrow") in December 1938 and supervised division's pre-war training and preparation for combat deployment.

Fish was relieved of command in March 1942, because United States Army preferred Regular Army officer in command of combat division. He spent rest of the War in Washington, D.C., serving on staff positions in the United States War Department.

Biography

Early career

Irving A. Fish was born on August 25, 1881, in Racine, Wisconsin as the son of John T. Fish and Eliza Sampson. His father was an attorney and veteran of American Civil War for Union as captain in 13th Wisconsin Infantry Regiment. Irving graduated from the high school there and enrolled the University of Wisconsin in Madison, Wisconsin in summer of 1899. While at the university, he was a member of the Cadet Corps and enlisted the Wisconsin National Guard.

Fish graduated with Bachelor of Laws in June 1903 and promoted to captain in the 1st Wisconsin Infantry Regiment. He was admitted to the State Bar of Wisconsin in 1903 and began practice law in Racine and then Madison, Wisconsin. In 1907, Fish moved to Milwaukee and began working for a law firm Quarles, Spence & Quarles. He rose to the rank of Major in the National Guard by February 1913 and when his regiment was called up for federal service in July 1916, he served on the Mexican Border during Pancho Villa Expedition.

Upon the United States entry into World War I, 1st Wisconsin Infantry was converted to 120th Field Artillery Regiment and embarked for France as the part of 32nd Infantry Division after a period of intensive training. Fish then participated in the Battles of Marne, Oise and Meuse-Argonne Offensive on the Western Front and returned stateside as Colonel.

Interwar period

Following his return stateside, Fish resumed his law practice, while retained his rank within the Wisconsin National Guard. He commanded 376th Field Artillery Regiment of the National Guard from October 1921 to January 1927 and upon his promotion to the rank of Brigadier General in July 1927, Fish assumed command of 57th Field Artillery Brigade attached to the 32nd Infantry Division. He was then promoted to Major General on December 22, 1938, and assumed command of 32nd Infantry Division.

World War II

The 32nd Infantry Division was called up for Federal service in mid-October 1940 and Fish assumed rank of major general in the Army of the United States. His division was made up of National Guard units from Michigan and Wisconsin and Fish supervised its pre-deployment training at Camp Beauregard, Louisiana and then led division during Louisiana Maneuvers in the fall of 1941.

Following the United States entry into World War II, Fish was replaced by Regular Army Major general Edwin F. Harding and ordered to Fort Lewis, Washington for duty as Commanding General of Troops with additional duty as Commander of a subsector of Western Defense Command. While in this capacity, he was responsible for interior defense of Washington and Oregon. Fish was transferred to the Adjutant General Office, War Department General Staff in Washington, D.C. in May 1943 and assumed duty as a member of the War Department Dependency Board under Major General Jay L. Benedict. The board was responsible for policies governing the release of casualty information to next-of-kin.

In January 1944, Secretary of War Henry L. Stimson established the Secretary of War's Separation Board and Fish joined that board as a member under Major General William Bryden. Consisting of five general officers of Regular Army and Reserves (MG Bryden; MG Fish; BG Nathaniel H. Egleston; BG Frank S. Clark; BG Edward A. Evans), the board acted for the Secretary of War on matters pertaining commissioned and warrant officers on matters including separation and relief from active duty; retention on active duty in a limited service status after appearance before a retiring board; certain cases involving disability etc. For his service in Washington, he was decorated with Legion of Merit.

Retirement and death

Upon his retirement from the Army on October 10, 1945, Fish returned to his Milwaukee, where he resumed his law practice with the law firm of Fish, Marshutz and Hoffman. He died suddenly on April 22, 1948, aged 66 and was buried at Mound Cemetery in his native Racine, Wisconsin. Fish was survived by his wife, Margaret and a son James.

Honors and awards

Here is the ribbon bar of Major general Fish:

References

1881 births
1948 deaths
People from Racine, Wisconsin
University of Wisconsin–Madison alumni
Military personnel from Wisconsin
National Guard (United States) generals
American military personnel of World War I
United States Army personnel of World War I
Recipients of the Legion of Merit
United States Army generals of World War II
United States Army generals